William Bellenden ( 1550 – c. 1633) was a Scottish scholar.

William Bellenden may also refer to:

William Bellenden, 1st Lord Bellenden (died 1671), Treasurer-depute of Scotland
William Ballantine (priest) (1616–1661), a.k.a. William Bellenden